Fyodor Ivanovich Gagloyev (born 26 September 1966) is a Russian professional football coach and a former player.

He made his professional debut in the Soviet Second League in 1983 for FC Spartak Ordzhonikidze. He played 1 game for the main squad of FC Dynamo Moscow in the USSR Federation Cup.

Honours
 Uzbek League champion: 1992.

References

1966 births
Sportspeople from Vladikavkaz
Living people
Soviet footballers
Russian footballers
FC Spartak Vladikavkaz players
FC Dynamo Moscow players
FC Elista players
FC Dynamo Stavropol players
Russian Premier League players
FC Lokomotiv Nizhny Novgorod players
PFC Krylia Sovetov Samara players
FC Tekstilshchik Kamyshin players
Russian football managers
FC Dynamo Stavropol managers
FC Lokomotiv Nizhny Novgorod managers
FC Spartak Vladikavkaz managers
Russian expatriate footballers
Expatriate footballers in Uzbekistan
Russian expatriate sportspeople in Kazakhstan
FC Yugra Nizhnevartovsk players
Association football midfielders